Anayesht (also Romanized as ‘Anāyesht; also known as Ānāghesht and Enā‘esht) is a village in Poshtkuh-e Mugui Rural District, in the Central District of Fereydunshahr County, Isfahan Province, Iran. At the 2006 census, its population was 100, in 20 families.

References 

Populated places in Fereydunshahr County